The Paul C. Murphy House is a 2.5-story residence in southeast Portland, in the U.S. state of Oregon. Built in 1916 in the English Cottage style, it was added to the National Register of Historic Places in 1991.

Its interior has formal living spaces on the ground floor, bedrooms on the second floor, a full attic, and a basement with a family room and tiled fireplace. Rooms on the main floor include a central hall, living room, dining room, den, kitchen, pantry, half-bath, and sun porch. On the second floor are three bedrooms, a sleeping porch, and two bathrooms. The house has a separate servants' entrance at the rear and a servants' staircase leading to a bedroom, sewing room, and bathroom in the attic. The exterior features a hipped roof, multiple gables, small gabled dormers, and a glass-enclosed porch.

The home originally belonged to Paul Cole Murphy, a real-estate developer and president of the Ladd Estate Company, which was organized in 1908 to manage the properties of the locally prominent Ladd family. In 1909, Murphy and others bought a large property, Hazelfern Farm, from the Ladds and formed the Laurelhurst Company to develop Laurelhurst, a park-like residential neighborhood that includes the Murphy House. Murphy lived in this house until 1945, when he retired and moved to Santa Barbara.

See also
 National Register of Historic Places listings in Southeast Portland, Oregon

References

Houses on the National Register of Historic Places in Portland, Oregon
Houses completed in 1916
Arts and Crafts architecture in Oregon
Laurelhurst, Portland, Oregon
1916 establishments in Oregon
Southeast Portland, Oregon
Portland Historic Landmarks